Ágnes Gee (born 29 August 1974), previously known as Ágnes Muzamel, is a Hungarian former professional tennis player.

Gee, who was born in Budapest, appeared in seven Federation Cup ties for Hungary in the early 1990s, while competing on the professional tour.

From 1996 to 1999, she played college tennis for the University of Mississippi (Ole Miss). A four-time All-American, she was an NCAA singles quarterfinalist in 1998. She is a member of the Ole Miss Athletics Hall of Fame.

ITF Circuit finals

Doubles: 2 (2 titles)

See also
 List of Hungary Fed Cup team representatives

References

External links
 
 
 

1974 births
Living people
Hungarian female tennis players
Tennis players from Budapest
Ole Miss Rebels women's tennis players